VSI International Senior Secondary school is a coeducational school affiliated with the Board of Secondary Education, Rajasthan. The English medium school is located in Pratap Nagar, Sanganer Jaipur, Rajasthan, India. It was founded in 1979, and currently headed by Ms. Sangeeta Shrivastava and directed by Chartered Accountant R.C. Sharma. The school is managed by Blue Bells Shiksha Samiti.

Academics 
The school provides education from pre-primary to class XII.  They also have playgroup classes. Their academic classes are grouped into four categories:

Play Group
Playgroup classes are generally for 2 to 3-year-old children. Pre-school playgroup is for providing essential smooth transaction from home to school.

Pre-primary (Nursery, K.G. & Prep)
Classes for 3 to 5-year-old children. Various activities like storytelling, group games, toy games, reading, writing are conducted.

Junior Wing (Classes I to VII)
The junior wing or elementary school generally involves students from age group between 5 and 13, starting their academic careers.

Senior Wing (Classes IX to XII)
Students from ages 14 to 18 in the senior wing study the following subjects:
 Classes IX-X
 Language: Hindi, English, Sanskrit
 Science: Chemistry, Biology, Physics  
 Math
 Social Science: Economics, History, Geography, Civics
 Classes XI-XII
 Language: Hindi, English
 Science, Math
 Commerce
 Arts

External sources
 Board of Secondary Education, Rajasthan
 Department of School Education & Literacy
 School Report Cards
 Official Website

References 

Educational institutions established in 1979
Schools in Jaipur
1979 establishments in Rajasthan